Biharia is a commune in Bihor County, Crișana, Romania. It is composed of two villages, Biharia and Cauaceu (Hegyközkovácsi). In 2011 it had 4,205 inhabitants, of whom 85.87% were Hungarians, 12.12% Romanians and 1.73% Roma.

History

The village is first mentioned in 1067 as Byhor, later as Bychor in 1213, as Bihar in 1332, and again, in 1349 as Byhor.

The Gesta Hungarorum, which is believed to have been written around the time of King Béla III of Hungary (1172-1196), mentions that Duke Árpad (born 845) sent envoys to a castle called Bychor, to Duke Menumorout.

It has a complex political history with periods of the Kingdom of Hungary, Eastern Hungarian Kingdom and the Principality of Transylvania. After the break-up of Austria-Hungary, in 1920, the commune became part of the Kingdom of Romania. In 1940, as a result of the Second Vienna Award it was returned to Hungary. Since the end of the World War II it has been part of the Romanian state.

Sights 
 Biharia Citadel built in the 9th century, historic monument

References

Biharia
Localities in Crișana